The 5th Independent Spirit Awards, honoring the best in independent filmmaking for 1989, were announced on March 24, 1990 at the Hollywood Roosevelt Hotel in Los Angeles. It was hosted by Buck Henry.

Winners and nominees

{| class="wikitable"
!Best Feature
!Best Director
|-
|Sex, Lies, and Videotape

Drugstore Cowboy
Heat and Sunlight
Mystery Train
True Love
|Steven Soderbergh – Sex, Lies, and Videotape

Jim Jarmusch – Mystery Train
Charles Lane – Sidewalk Stories
Nancy Savoca – True Love
Gus Van Sant – Drugstore Cowboy
|-
!Best Actor
!Best Actress
|-
|Matt Dillon – Drugstore Cowboy

Nicolas Cage – Vampire's Kiss
Charles Lane – Sidewalk Stories
Randy Quaid – Parents
James Spader – Sex, Lies, and Videotape
|Andie MacDowell – Sex, Lies, and Videotape
Youki Kudoh – Mystery Train
Kelly Lynch – Drugstore Cowboy
Winona Ryder – Heathers
Annabella Sciorra – True Love
|-
!Best Supporting Actor
!Best Supporting Actress
|-
|Max Perlich – Drugstore Cowboy

Steve Buscemi – Mystery Train
Scott Coffey – Shag
Gary Farmer – Powwow Highway
Screamin' Jay Hawkins – Mystery Train
|Laura San Giacomo – Sex, Lies, and Videotape

Bridget Fonda – Shag
Heather Graham – Drugstore Cowboy
Mare Winningham – Miracle Mile
Mary Woronov – Scenes from the Class Struggle in Beverly Hills
|-
!Best Screenplay
!Best First Feature
|-
|Drugstore Cowboy – Gus Van Sant and Daniel Yost84 Charlie Mopic – Patrick S. Duncan
Heathers – Daniel Waters
Miracle Mile – Steve De Jarnatt
Mystery Train – Jim Jarmusch
|Heathers

84 Charlie Mopic
Powwow Highway
Sidewalk Stories
Talking to Strangers
|-
!Best Cinematography
!Best Foreign Film
|-
|Drugstore Cowboy – Robert YeomanEarth Girls Are Easy – Oliver Stapleton
Mystery Train – Robby Müller
Powwow Highway – Toyomichi Kurita
Talking to Strangers – Robert Tregenza
|My Left Foot • Ireland/UKDistant Voices, Still Lives • UK
Hanussen • Hungary/West Germany/Austria
High Hopes • UK
Rouge • Hong Kong
|}

 Films with multiple nominations and awards 

 Films that received multiple nominations 

 Films that won multiple awards 

Special Distinction AwardDo the Right Thing

References

External links
 1989 Spirit Awards at IMDb
 Official show on YouTube

1989
Independent Spirit Awards